"Always the Love Songs" is a song written by David Lee Murphy and George Ducas, and recorded by American country music group Eli Young Band.  It was released in September 2008 as the second single from the album Jet Black & Jealous.  This song is also the band's second chart entry on Billboard Hot Country Songs, as well as their first top 20 hit.

Content
"Always the Love Songs" is a mid-tempo song with electric guitar accompaniment. In it, the male narrator recalls a point earlier in his life, when he and his friends would gather around a bonfire, pass around a guitar, and sing songs. He states that it was "always the love songs" that he recalled the most from these sing-alongs.

Critical reception
Country Standard Time critic Brian Steinberg cited "Always the Love Songs" as a standout track on the album, saying that it showed a sense of interplay among the band members that was comparable to The Wallflowers. Andrew Leahey, reviewing the album for Allmusic, also compared the song's sound to that of The Wallflowers, saying that its intro was borrowed from "6th Avenue Heartache".

Music video
The music video for "Always the Love Songs" is of a live performance, and is directed by the band.

Chart performance

Year-end charts

Certifications

References

2008 singles
Eli Young Band songs
Songs written by David Lee Murphy
Songs written by George Ducas (singer)
Show Dog-Universal Music singles
2008 songs